The 2023 Challenger de Santiago was a professional tennis tournament played on clay courts. It was the 17th edition of the tournament which was part of the 2023 ATP Challenger Tour. It took place in Santiago, Chile between 6 and 12 March 2023.

Singles main-draw entrants

Seeds

 1 Rankings are as of 27 February 2023.

Other entrants
The following players received wildcards into the singles main draw:
  Gonzalo Lama
  Matías Soto
  Nicolás Villalón

The following players received entry from the qualifying draw:
  Daniel Dutra da Silva
  Federico Gaio
  Hugo Gaston
  Álvaro López San Martín
  Thiago Seyboth Wild
  Juan Bautista Torres

The following players received entry as lucky losers:
  João Lucas Reis da Silva
  Gonzalo Villanueva

Champions

Singles

  Hugo Dellien def.  Thiago Seyboth Wild 3–6, 6–3, 6–3.

Doubles

  Pedro Boscardin Dias /  João Lucas Reis da Silva def.  Diego Hidalgo /  Cristian Rodríguez 6–4, 3–6, [10–7].

References

2023 ATP Challenger Tour
2023
March 2023 sports events in South America
2023 in Chilean sport